Fanshi County, is a county in Xinzhou City, in the northeast of Shanxi Province, China, bordering Hebei province to the southeast. It is the easternmost county-level division of Xinzhou.

History
Fanshi County was one of the divisions of Yanmen Commandery under the Qin and Han.

Geography
Fanshi is located north of Mount Wutai and east of Daixian.

Climate

Economy
The primary industry of Fanshi county is gold mining.

References

County-level divisions of Shanxi
Xinzhou